The 1968 St. Louis Cardinals season was the team's 87th season in St. Louis, Missouri and its 77th season in the National League. The Cardinals went 97–65 during the season, winning their second consecutive NL pennant, this time by nine games over the San Francisco Giants. They lost in 7 games to the Detroit Tigers in the 1968 World Series. The Cardinals would not return to the postseason until 1982.

Following the season, Major League Baseball announced plans to split both the National and American Leagues into East and West divisions starting with the 1969 season in order to accommodate the inclusion of two new franchises to each league. The Cardinals were assigned to the new National League East division.  Originally, the Cardinals were placed in the National League West division.  However, the New York Mets, wanting to compensate for the loss of home games against the Los Angeles Dodgers and San Francisco Giants, desired three extra games against the Cardinals, the two-time defending NL champions.  The Cardinals were thus moved to the National League East division along with the Chicago Cubs, who wished to maintain their long-standing rivalry with the Cardinals.  The Atlanta Braves and Cincinnati Reds were correspondingly shifted to the National League West despite both being east of St. Louis and Chicago, a configuration maintained until 1993.

Offseason
 Prior to 1968 season: Luis Meléndez was signed as an amateur free agent by the Cardinals.
 February 8, 1968: Jimy Williams and Pat Corrales were traded by the Cardinals to the Cincinnati Reds for Johnny Edwards.

Regular season
Pitcher Bob Gibson won both the MVP Award and the Cy Young Award this year, with a 1.12 ERA, 22 wins, and 268 strikeouts. From June 2 to July 30, Gibson allowed only two earned runs in 92 innings pitched. For the season, opposing batters only had a batting average of .184, and an on-base percentage of .233 against Gibson. Gibson also won a Gold Glove this year, as did shortstop Dal Maxvill and outfielder Curt Flood.

Season standings

Record vs. opponents

Opening Day lineup

Notable transactions
 June 7, 1968: Bob Forsch was drafted by the Cardinals in the 26th round of the 1968 Major League Baseball Draft.
 June 14, 1968: Ramón Hernández was purchased by the Cardinals from the Chicago Cubs.

Roster

Player stats

Batting

Starters by position
Note: Pos = Position; G = Games played; AB = At bats; H = Hits; Avg. = Batting average; HR = Home runs; RBI = Runs batted in

Other batters
Note: G = Games played; AB = At bats; H = Hits; Avg. = Batting average; HR = Home runs; RBI = Runs batted in

Pitching

Starting pitchers
Note: G = Games pitched; IP = Innings pitched; W = Wins; L = Losses; ERA = Earned run average; SO = Strikeouts

Other pitchers
Note: G = Games pitched; IP = Innings pitched; W = Wins; L = Losses; ERA = Earned run average; SO = Strikeouts

Relief pitchers
Note: G = Games pitched; W = Wins; L = Losses; SV = Saves; ERA = Earned run average; SO = Strikeouts

1968 World Series 

Although essentially the same team as the previous year, they faced a tougher American League opponent in the Detroit Tigers, who had also won their pennant easily, behind the 31-win season of Denny McLain.  Even though both Gibson and McLain were league MVPs that season, another Tigers starter, Mickey Lolich, stole the show, becoming the last pitcher to date to win three complete games in a single Series.  Gibson excelled again in this World Series, winning Games 1 and 4.  He had 17 strikeouts in Game 1 and totaled 35 strikeouts in the Series, both still World Series records.  The Cardinals advanced to a 3–1 series lead, but the Tigers completed an improbable comeback by winning the final three games of the series to claim the championship, 4 games to 3. It was St. Louis' last Series appearance until 1982, and their last Series before MLB adopted its divisional format.

AL Detroit Tigers (4) vs. NL St. Louis Cardinals (3)

Awards and honors
 Red Schoendienst, Associated Press NL Manager of the Year

Major League Baseball records 
 Bob Gibson, major league record, lowest ERA in one season for a pitcher with more than 300 innings pitched (1.12)

League leaders 
 Lou Brock, National League stolen base leader, 62

Farm system

LEAGUE CHAMPIONS: Tulsa

References

External links
1968 St. Louis Cardinals at Baseball Reference
1968 St. Louis Cardinals team page at www.baseball-almanac.com

St. Louis Cardinals seasons
Saint Louis Cardinals season
National League champion seasons
St Louis